The ChillOut Festival is held in Daylesford, Victoria, every year on the Victorian Labour Day long weekend in March.  It commenced in 1997 and is now the largest LGBTQI festival in regional Australia, and also the largest festival of any kind in the Shire of Hepburn.

Notes

1997 establishments in Australia
LGBT in Victoria (Australia)
Pride parades in Australia
Festivals established in 1997
Carnivals in Australia